This is a list of solo piano pieces by Joseph Haydn.

Piano sonatas 

Two numbering schemes for the sonatas are commonly used. Here, the pieces are sorted using the numbering method proposed by H. C. Robbins Landon, while the "Hob. XVI" specification refers to its index in the Hoboken catalogue.

Piano pieces
These works are in Category XVII of the Hoboken catalogue.

Capriccio in G major on "Acht Sauschneider müssen sein", Hob. XVII/1
Twenty Variations in G major, Hob. XVII/2
Arietta con 12 Variazioni, Hob. XVII/3
Fantasia (Capriccio) in C major, Hob. XVII/4 (1789)
Variations (6) in C major, Hob. XVII/5 (1790)
Variations in F minor, Un piccolo divertimento, Hob. XVII/6 (1793)
Variations (5) in D major, Hob. XVII/7
Variations (8) in D major, Hob. XVII/8
Adagio in F major, Hob. XVII/9
Allegretto in G major, Hob. XVII/10
Andante in C major, Hob. XVII/11 (doubtful)
Andante con variazioni (4) in B major, Hob. XVII/12

See also 
 List of concertos by Joseph Haydn
 List of masses by Joseph Haydn
 List of operas by Joseph Haydn
 List of piano trios by Joseph Haydn
 List of string quartets by Joseph Haydn
 List of symphonies by Joseph Haydn
 Hoboken catalogue

Notes

External links

 Complete recording of Joseph Haydn's Piano Sonatas on a sampled Walter fortepiano and on a sampled Steinway D

Piano solo
 
Lists of piano compositions by composer
Piano compositions in the Classical era